Klaus Lausch (born 19 February 1964) is a former speedway rider who competed in speedway, Longtrack and Grasstrack Racing. He reached eight World Longtrack world championship Finals finishing second in 1988.

He joined the Oxford Cheetahs in 1984 and was part of the title winning team in 1985.

World Longtrack Championship

Final
 1983  Marianske Lazne (Reserve N/S)
 1984  Herxheim (th) pts
 1985  Esbjerg (11th) 6pts
 1987  Mühldorf (14th) 5pts
 1988  Scheeßel (32nd) 2pts
 1989  Marianske Lazne (17th) 1pt
 1990  Herxheim (5th) 28pts
 1991  Marianske Lazne (11th) 7pts
 1992  Pfarrkirchen (8th) 10pts

Semi-final
 1982  Vilshofen (12th) 4pts
 1986  Marianske Lazne (15th) 6pts

Qualifying round
 1984  Scheeßel (Reserve N/S)

World Final appearances

World Pairs Championship
 1986* -  Pocking, Rottalstadion (with Karl Maier) - 6th - 27pts (5)
 1990* -  Landshut, Ellermühle Stadium (with Gerd Riss) - 9th - 15pts (15)
 1991** -  Poznań, Olimpia Poznań Stadium (with Gerd Riss - 4th - 18pts (9)

* Competed for West Germany.

** Competed for Germany.

German Individual Speedway Championship
 1988  Brokstedt (Champion) 14pts (After run off with Tommy Dunker).
 1989  Norden (Champion) 15pts
 1990  Neustadt (Champion) 15pts

References
 http://grasstrackgb.co.uk/klaus-lausch/
 http://wwosbackup.proboards.com/thread/1679/klaus-lausch
 http://www.przegladsportowy.pl/zuzel,klaus-lausch-jest-moda-na-johnsa-i-skandynawow,artykul,552649,1,281.html

1964 births
German speedway riders
Polonia Bydgoszcz riders
Living people
German expatriate sportspeople in Poland
Place of birth missing (living people)
Individual Speedway Long Track World Championship riders
Oxford Cheetahs riders